Shafi Ahmed is a chief surgeon, teacher, futurist, innovator, professor and entrepreneur.

He was born on 26 January 1969 in Sylhet District, East Pakistan (now Bangladesh), and came to the United Kingdom as a child.

Biography

Personal life

Ahmed lives in London. He is married to Farzana Hussain, a general practitioner, with whom he has two children.

Early life and education

Ahmed attended Chadwell Heath High School (now Chadwell Heath Academy) before attending the Redbridge technical college.

From 1988 to 1993, he studied medicine at King's College Hospital School of Medicine. As the elected President of the Medical and Dental Society, he helped introduce medical ethics into the curriculum.

During his surgical training in London, he undertook a period of research at The Royal London Hospital and the Queen Mary University of London. In 2010, he obtained a PhD with a thesis entitled "The role of microarray profiling in predicting outcome in patients with colorectal cancer".

Ahmed has been awarded four honorary PhDs (Honoris Causa) from Udabol University Bolivia, SIISDET Colombia, the University of Peru of Science and Informatics and EXIBED, Spain.

In 2017, he was appointed as an honorary professor at The University of Bradford and awarded an Honorary Doctorate of Medicine in 2019.

In 2020 he was awarded the Spinoza Honorary professorship at the University of Amsterdam.

Career
Ahmed is a specialist advisor to the Abu Dhabi Ministry of Health to help deliver innovation and digital health.

Clinical practice

Ahmed works in the Academic Centre of Surgery and has established minimally invasive colorectal surgery at the Royal London Hospital, Barts Health NHS Trust.

His main clinical interest is colorectal cancer, and he performs surgery for primary and recurrent disease as well as multi-visceral resections.

He has pioneered single incision laparoscopic colorectal surgery (virtual scarless surgery) and also works with liver surgeons to perform simultaneous laparoscopic liver and bowel resections for cancer. His other clinical interest is advanced stage 3/4 endometriosis, performing laparoscopic surgery with gynaecologists. This has led to the development and recognition of a national centre for endometriosis. In addition, he has specialist experience in complex abdominal wall hernias and reconstruction.

From 2010 to 2015, Ahmed was the lead clinician and multi-disciplinary team lead for colorectal cancer at Barts Health NHS Trust. He was also a CQC specialist advisor in general surgery.

Teaching

Ahmed was the Associate Dean for Barts and the London undergraduate medical students at The Royal London Hospital from 2010 to 2019 and was the lead for surgery. He was programme director for core surgical trainees for North East London 2012–2013 and Tutor in Surgery for the Royal London Hospital 2011–2013. He teaches innovation and digital transformation for surgeons at Harvard Medical School and Imperial College London.

He is the civilian advisor for the British Armed forces for general surgery.

Royal College of Surgeons of England
From 2013 to 2019, Ahmed was elected onto the council of the Royal College of Surgeons of England. He had numerous roles and lead the International Surgical Training Programme. He was part of the Cancer 2020, 5 Year Forward View Taskforce 2015. He is a member of the court of examiners and is an international convenor of the MRCS for Bangladesh.

NHS

In 2007, Ahmed was appointed as a Consultant General, Laparoscopic and Colorectal surgeon to The Royal London Hospital and St Bartholomew's Hospital, Barts Health NHS Trust.

He was chosen to curate the @NHS Twitter account from 27 February 2017 to 3 March 2017 and tweeted the world's first live operation via this account.

He was the clinical lead for surgery at the NHS Nightingale Hospital at Excel London during the COVID-19 pandemic in 2020.

Ahmed performed a live cancer operation at The Royal London Hospital on Channel 5 for the series Operation Live in 2018.

Barts X Medicine
Ahmed is the module lead for an innovative new course at Barts and the London Medical School which aims to teach the third year medical students about future medicine and how to generate ideas to improve clinical care. The students are taught by digital health innovators and those involved in Medtech from the UK and US.

Entrepreneurship
Ahmed has been working on new technologies enhancing surgical education globally. His online videos have been watched hundreds of thousands of times, earning him the accolade of the most-watched surgeon in human history.

He aims to teach surgery and surgical processes to thousands of students at a time using VR technology.

Virtual Medics

Ahmed's company Virtual Medics developed the use of wearable technology in education and clinical practice. This has allowed the development of a web-placed platform to stream live and interactive teaching.

In May 2014, using Google Glass, he performed and streamed a live operation to 14 thousand students across 132 countries and 1100 cities.

Medical Realities

Ahmed is the co-founder of Medical Realities, a group offering surgical training products, specialising in virtual reality, augmented reality and serious games. Through Medical Realities, he aims to provide tutorials in a modular format to teaching hospitals around the world. This will be made accessible to students and surgical trainees.

On 14 April 2016, in collaboration with Barts Health, Medical Realities and Mativision, he performed the world's first virtual reality operation recorded and streamed live in 360 degrees. This was viewed by 55,000 people in 140 countries and 4000 cities and reached 4.6 million people on Twitter.

This event was covered worldwide on over 400 newspaper/online articles and BBC Click, Sky News, ARD German, TRT News, South American NTN, ABC News, Aljazeera, and Press TV. His work has been featured on Wired, The Guardian, The Telegraph, ABC News, CNET, The Verge, Huffington Post, and Tech China.

On 9 December 2016, he performed the world's first live operation using Snapchat Spectacles where he trained 200 medical students and surgical trainees, which was covered by Time magazine, and BBC. The operation has been viewed over 100,000 times.

He is a non-executive director of Medic creations, GPDQ and Imera.

He is the chair of the GIANT (Global Innovation and New Technologies) Health Event in London and also the chair of the Webit Health conference in Sofia, Bulgaria, which showcases startups, innovation, technology and entrepreneurship.

Notable lectures
Ahmed is a three time TEDx speaker and four times Wired Health and international keynote speaker, and a member of the faculty at Exponential Medicine, Singularity University.
 
 TEDx: TEDx Barts Health: TEDx Goodenough College: TEDx CASS Business school
 UK: Wired Health x4, Royal Society of Medicine Innovation Summit x2, CogX, AI Summit
 USA: Exponential Medicine x5 Digital Health Summer Summit, Digital Orthopaedics, AWE
 Dubai: World Government Summit, Dubai Health Forum, GITEX x 3
 Abu Dhabi: TIPS, HUB71
 India: Tryst Conference, India Institute of Technology, Delhi
 Belgium: MedTech Forum
 Denmark: CopenX
 UAE: LEAP 2023
 Romania: ICEE Fest

On 15 March 2017, Ahmed delivered the Cantor Technology Lecture at the University of Bradford and also delivered the public lecture to open the Digital Health Enterprise Zone.

Philanthropy
He is Vice-President of Proshanti, a local charity community project to set up a health programme in Bangladesh, He is an advisor to Beani Bazaar Cancer Hospital, Bangladesh. He also teaches and trains surgeons in Dhaka, Bangladesh where he is the Dean for education at Rahetid, a postgraduate surgical training centre.

Awards and accolades
 Jelf Medal 1990: Awarded by the Principal of the college for the best academic and social achievement in the medical faculty of King's College School of Medicine and Dentistry
 W.G. Oakley Prize in Diabetes 1992: Awarded for an original dissertation entitled "Diabetic Neuroarthropathy: the Pathogenesis of the Charcot joint"
 British Journal of Surgery Prize 2004: Awarded at the Association of Coloproctology, Edinburgh 2004 for best oral presentation "Prediction of Lymph Node Status in Colorectal Cancer by Microarray Profiling"
 Silver Scalpel Prize 2015: Awarded by the Association of Surgeons of Training for Best Surgical Trainer in the UK
 2016: Winner of the Islamic Society of Britain/British Telecom Innovation Business and Skills Award
 Barts Health Heroes Awards: 2013 - 2017 Highly commended for Relentlessly improving and innovating for patient safety
 2017: Shortlisted for Digital Pioneer Awards of London for Innovation
 Selected in the British Bangladeshi Power and Inspiration 100 and awarded the honour of the British Bangladeshi Person of the Year 2017
 Chairman's Prize for Outstanding Contribution to HealthTech at the Asian Tech Awards 2017
 Webit global digital health innovation award 2017
 Digital Leader Award 2017: He received this award from Alternative Doctors
 NHS70 Parliamentary Award 2018: Winner of the Future NHS award
 HIMSS 2020 Global Leader in Digital Health

References

1969 births
Living people
People from Sylhet District
British surgeons
British educators
British innovators
British businesspeople